Abbie Prosser (born 4 September 1991) is an English association football midfielder, who currently plays for Doncaster Rovers Belles L.F.C. Prosser has represented England women's national football team at under-19 level.

Club career
Prosser started off playing for Arsenal Ladies from the age of 8, and left the club at the age of 17, making 2 first team appearances. She then went to play for Barnet F.C. Ladies, before moving to play for Doncaster Rovers in 2011, where she scored no goals in her seven appearances. However, for the England women's national under-19 football team, Prosser played 18 matches, scoring one goal. Prosser was in the England women's national under-23 World Cup Squad in Germany in 2011.

Family
Prosser is the sister of Luke Prosser, who is also a footballer.

References

1991 births
Living people
Place of birth missing (living people)
English women's footballers
Women's association football midfielders